Despertar is Spanish for "to wake". It may refer to:
Despertar, an anarchist weekly in Ceuta from 1931 to 1932, the official organ of the Confederación Nacional del Trabajo
"Despertar", a 2020 single released by Estopa and Amaral

See also

Al Despertar (disambiguation)